Sir Henry John Stedman Cotton,  (13 September 1845 – 22 October 1915) had a long career in the Indian Civil Service, during which he was sympathetic to Indian nationalism.  After returning to England, he served as a Liberal Party Member of Parliament (MP) for Nottingham East from 1906 to January 1910.

Early life
Cotton was born in 1845 in the city of Kumbakonam in the Madras region of India, to Indian-born parents of English descent, Joseph John Cotton (1813-1867) and Susan Jessie Minchin (1823-1888). Through his paternal great-grandfather Joseph Cotton (1745–1825), Henry John Stedman Cotton was a first cousin once removed of both the judge Henry Cotton (his godfather, who he was named after) and of the African explorer William Cotton Oswell.
The British man of letters James S. Cotton was his brother.

In 1848, he left India to be educated in England. He entered Magdalen College School in 1856, Brighton College in 1859, and King's College London in 1861. After his graduation from college, he took and passed the Indian Civil Service Examination.

Career
Cotton joined the Indian Civil Service, arriving in India in 1867. His first posting was at Midnapore, where his immediate superior was Sir William James Herschel, then the local magistrate. His eldest son Evan was born in that city in 1868.

He later served in Chuadanga, where he witnessed the great flood of 1871.  In 1872 he was posted to Calcutta, and in 1873 he was appointed Assistant Secretary to 
the Bengal Government by Sir George Campbell, and later worked under Sir Richard Temple.  In 1878 he became magistrate and collector at Chittagong; in 1880 he became Senior Secretary to the Board of Revenue in Bengal.  He later became Revenue Secretary to Government, Financial and Municipal Secretary, and then a member of the Bengal Legislative Council.

Cotton eventually rose to be Chief Commissioner of Assam (1896 to 1902), during which time he experienced the 1897 Assam earthquake. The Viceroy, Lord Curzon, visited Assam in March 1900, and in an address afterwards praised Cotton's ″effort and interest in the province″, but was otherways unusually careful not to promise much in his speeches during the visit. Cotton College, Guwahati, the oldest institute of higher education in Assam and all of Northeast India was established in 1901 by Cotton. As he retired, he was appointed a Knight Commander of the Order of the Star of India (KCSI) in the 1902 Coronation Honours list published on 26 June 1902, and invested as such by King Edward VII at Buckingham Palace on 24 October 1902.

Cotton supported Indian Home Rule and got into serious trouble when he advocated the cause in his 1885 book New India, or India in Transition (revised edition 1907). In 1904, he served as President of the Indian National Congress, one of the few non-Indians to do so. As such, he led the opposition to Lord Curzon's invasion of Tibet and partition of Bengal.

On his return to England, Cotton was elected Liberal Party Member of Parliament (MP) for Nottingham East in 1906. There he formed a radical pro-Indian parliamentary group, and criticised his own government's actions in India. Already in poor health, he was narrowly defeated in his attempt for re-election in 1910.

Personal life

In 1867 in Freshwater, Isle of Wight, Cotton married Mary Ryan (1848-1914). They had four children: Evan (1868-1939), Julian James Cotton (1869-1927), Mary Cotton (b. 1873), and Albert Louis Cotton (1874-1936). 

Cotton met and married Ryan having seen a picture of her taken by pioneering photographer Julia Margaret Cameron. Ryan had been partly raised by Cameron, who found her as a child begging on Putney Heath. The couple were photographed together by Cameron, in costume as Romeo and Juliet, on their wedding day.

Two of his sons, Evan and Julian, also made careers in the civil service in India. Cotton's grandson, Sir John Cotton (1909–2002), was Ambassador to the Congo Republic and Burundi and the last of six generations of Cottons to serve in colonial administration in India.

He was an active writer and activist on behalf of Indian rights until the end of his life, despite ill health and financial difficulties. In 1911 he published his memoirs, Indian and Home Memories. Sir Henry Cotton died at his home in St John's Wood, London, in October 1915.

References

External links 
 

1845 births
1915 deaths
People educated at Magdalen College School, Oxford
People educated at Brighton College
Alumni of King's College London
Presidents of the Indian National Congress
UK MPs 1906–1910
Liberal Party (UK) MPs for English constituencies
Knights Commander of the Order of the Star of India
Indian Civil Service (British India) officers
Nathaniel Cotton family